Common names for "rush" are usually related to a particular genus from a botanical family, for example:
Rush family: Juncaceae
Sedge family: Cyperaceae
Bulrush family: Typhaceae

Common names - British Isles
Rush family – Juncaceae

Genus – Juncus

Species – Juncus effusus
Common rush
Soft rush

Sedge family – Cyperaceae

Genus – Schoenoplectus

Species – Schoenoplectus lacustris
Common club-rush
Bulrush
Rush

Bulrush family – Typhaceae

Genus – Typha

Species – Typha latifolia
 Bulrush
 Reedmace

Common names - North America
Rush family – Juncaceae

Genus – Juncus

Species – Juncus effusus
Common rush
Soft rush

Species – Juncus interior
Soft rush
Interior rush

Sedge family – Cyperaceae

Genus – Schoenoplectus

Species – Schoenoplectus acutus
Tule
Common tule
Hardstem tule 
Tule rush
Hardstem bulrush
Viscid bulrush

Bulrush family – Typhaceae

Genus – Typha
Reed
Cattail
Punks

Notes

Citations

Sources

Books

External links
Plantlife Plantlife is a British conservation charity